Ángela Melania Castro Chirivechz (born 21 February 1993) is a Bolivian race walker. She competed in the women's 20 kilometres walk event at the 2016 Summer Olympics finishing in 18th place. It was the best result ever for Bolivia in Olympic athletics. She was the flag bearer for Bolivia during both the opening ceremony and closing ceremony.

She competed at the 2020 Summer Olympics, in Women's 20 km walk. She won the 2021 Bolivian Race Walking Championship. She competed in the women's 20 kilometres walk at the 2022 World Athletics Championships held in Eugene, Oregon, United States.

References

External links

1993 births
Living people
Bolivian female racewalkers
Sportspeople from La Paz
Athletes (track and field) at the 2016 Summer Olympics
Athletes (track and field) at the 2020 Summer Olympics
Olympic athletes of Bolivia
South American Games silver medalists for Bolivia
South American Games medalists in athletics
Competitors at the 2018 South American Games
Athletes (track and field) at the 2019 Pan American Games
Pan American Games competitors for Bolivia
20th-century Bolivian women
21st-century Bolivian women